Naqshbandia Silsilah, a Sufi order, was spread in India by two Sufi saints and formed two chains or lineages. One chain is linked with Shaykh Ahmad Sirhindi who is also described as Mujaddid Alf Thaani (reviver of the second millennium); his chain is called Naqshbandia Mujaddidia. The other chain was associated with his contemporary Sufi saint Syedna Ameer Abul-Ula Ahrari. A resident of Agra, Ameer Abul-Ula was a descendant of the Sufi saint Khwaja Ubaidullah Ahrar. It is because of his name that this chain is known as Naqshbandia Abul-Ulaiya.

Birth and family lineage 

Munim Pak  was born in ( 1082 hijiri/ 1671AD) in the village, Pachna, Shaikhpura, Bihar. His family linage meets up with Makhdoom Shamsuddin Haqqani who is one of the great sufi of his time, was disciple of  Ibrāhīm bin Adham.

Education and spiritual training 
Having completed his primary education at his paternal village he went to Deewan Syed Abu Sayeed Jaafer Muhammad Quadri's khanqah at Barh district near Patna, for higher education and knowledge of Sufism. After his death Munim Pak received knowledge from his son Deewan Syed Khaleeluddin and became his "murid" (disciple) under Quadria Qutubia order and was rewarded with "Khilafah". After finishing his education he moved to Delhi with the instruction and permission of his "peer". or around forty years he taught the students of higher education at the Madrasa situated behind the Jama Masjid in Delhi.

Works 
He wrote three books during his stay in Delhi, "Mukashifat-e-Munemi", "Ilhamat-e-Munemi" and "Mushahidat-e-Munemi" in 1119 Hijri, 1120 Hijri and 1123 Hijri respectively. The manuscripts of "Ilhamat-E-Munemi" and "Mukashifat-E-Munemi" are available at Khudabakhsh Library, Patna and other libraries of the subcontinent. The manuscripts of "Mushahidat-E-Munemi" are not so widely available.

References

Other sources
 

1671 births
1771 deaths
Indian Sufi saints
Naqshbandi order